The National Scholastic Surfing Association (NSSA) is a surfing association in the United States. It is a member organization of Surfing America, the National Governing Body of Surfing in the United States. Founded in 1978 by Tom Gibbons, John Rothrock, Chuck Allen, Laird Hayes, Holly Allen, and Rob Hill.

Many well-known surfers have competed in the NSSA before turning professional. These include Kelly Slater, Andy Irons, Carissa Moore, Kalani Robb, Cheyne Magnusson, Bethany Hamilton and Bobby Martinez. Carissa Moore currently holds the most NSSA Nationals titles with 11 overall while Kolohe Andino holds the most titles won by a male competitor (9).

National Championship Titles
 National Scholastic Surfing Association (1978 - 2019)

National Open Champions

National Explorer Champions

College Team Champions

College Individual

References

External links
 Official NSSA website

Surfing organizations
Surfing in the United States